Russell Greiner is a Professor of Computing Science at the University of Alberta. He is a Fellow of the AAAI (Association for the Advancement of Artificial Intelligence) and well known for his work in Machine Learning and Bioinformatics. Professor Greiner is one of the principal investigators at the Alberta Innovates Centre for Machine Learning (AICML) and has published over 200 refereed papers and patents.

He has served as the chair of International Conference on Machine Learning, Intelligent Systems for Molecular Biology and Uncertainty in Artificial Intelligence. He is the Editor-in-Chief for Computational Intelligence (journal), and serves as a member of editorial board for Journal of Machine Learning Research, Machine Learning (journal) and Journal of Artificial Intelligence Research.

References

External links 
 Russ Greiner at the University of Alberta

Canadian computer scientists
Academic staff of the University of Alberta
Living people
Year of birth missing (living people)